Bad mood may refer to:
Bad mood (psychology)

Music

Albums
Bad Mood (album), a 1993 album by Lonnie Gordon

Songs
"Bad Mood" a song by Lonnie Gordon
"Bad Mood", a song on Helmet's 1990 album Strap It On
"Bad Mood" (Miley Cyrus song), on the 2017 album Younger Now
"Bad Mood" (The Vaccines song), a 2013 song by The Vaccines
"Bad Mood", a song by What's Eating Gilbert from That New Sound You're Looking For
"Bad Mood", a 2017 song by Miley Cyrus from Younger Now